Songs from The Screen is an album of Lea Salonga performing with the Manila Philharmonic Orchestra. It was performed live at PICC Plenary Hall in Pasay, Philippines. Her brother, Gerard Salonga, was the conductor and musical director.

Track listing 
A Tribute to Henry Mancini (feat. MPO)
Can You Read My Mind?
Our Love is Here to Stay
Through The Eyes of Love
What Matters Most / It Might Be You
Colors of the Wind (from Pocahontas) 
Ikaw
Tukso
Over the Rainbow (from The Wizard of Oz)
Pinoy Pop Medley (Sana'y Maghintay Ang Walang Hanggan - Kahit Na - Mahawi Man Ang Ulap - Ikaw Lang Ang Mamahalin - Ikaw Lamang - Bituing Walang Ningning)

Lea Salonga albums
2001 albums